Events in the year 1988 in Belgium.

Incumbents
 Monarch: Baudouin
 Prime Minister: Wilfried Martens

Events
 20 September – Margaret Thatcher gives a speech in Bruges.
 9 October – Municipal elections

Publications
 OECD, Economic Surveys, 1987/1988: Belgium, Luxembourg
 François Perin, Histoire d'une nation introuvable (Brussels, Legrain).

Births
 22 February – Kevin Borlée, sprinter
 8 October – Hanne Gaby Odiele, model

Deaths

28 October – Lucien Leboutte (born 1898), air chief

References

 
1980s in Belgium
20th century in Belgium
Events in Belgium
Deaths in Belgium